Jerry (Yoram) Wind is The Lauder Professor and Professor of Marketing at The Wharton School of the University of Pennsylvania, and is the founding director of the Wharton "think tank,” The SEI Center for Advanced Studies in Management. He is internationally known for pioneering research on organizational buying behaviour, market segmentation, conjoint analysis, and marketing strategy. He consults with major firms around the world, provides expert testimony in many intellectual property and antitrust cases, and has lectured in over 50 universities worldwide.

Education 
Professor Wind received his PhD from Stanford University in 1967 and his MA (1963)and B Soc Sci (1961) degrees from The Hebrew University in Jerusalem. He also received an M.A. Honors from the University of Pennsylvania.

Career 
Over the years, Wind has served as editor-in-chief of the Journal of Marketing, the policy boards of the Journal of Consumer Research and Marketing Science, the editorial boards and guest editor of all the major marketing journals. He led the creation of the Wharton Executive MBA Program (1974) and was founding director of both The Joseph H. Lauder Institute (1983-1988) and Wharton International Forum (1987). He led the reinvention of the Wharton MBA curriculum (1991–93) and the development of the Wharton globalization strategy (1995-1997).  He is the founding director of the Wharton SEI Center for Advanced Studies in Management, whose mission is to ensure the relevance of management research and education to the evolving needs of business and society in the 21st century by partnering with global thought leaders in diverse fields to anticipate the needs of management, identify forces of change, and understand and create emerging management paradigms. Professor Wind is also the founding academic director of The Wharton Fellows Program (2000), a powerful global network of CEOs and senior executives who are committed to lifelong learning focused on transformational leadership. He is the founding director the Wharton Future of Advertising Program (2008), whose mission is to act as a catalyst for deeper insights, bolder innovation, and broader positive impact of advertising.

Professor Wind has taught MBA courses in Marketing Strategy, Marketing Methods and Applications for Business Consulting, Creativity and Interactive Marketing in the Age of the Empowered Consumer.  His current research focuses on the network challenge; creativity and innovation; the future of marketing and advertising; and creating a creative organization.  He is an active consultant and board member of various startups and university programs, such as the Positive Psychology Center and Integrated Product Design Committee.  He also holds positions in numerous professional associations, including the Marketing Accountability Standards Board.  He is a trustee of the Philadelphia Museum of Art, where he chairs its Marketing Advisory Committee and is a member of its Brand Steering Group and the Digital Age Committee.  Professor Wind is the co-founder of the Interdisciplinary Center Herzliya, Israel (IDC), and since its founding in 1994, the chairman of its academic council.  Professor Wind previously served as the academic trustee of the Marketing Science Institute (1989-1995), chairman of The Institute of Management Sciences College of Marketing (1974-1975) and chancellor of The International Academy of Management (2000-2006).

Wind is The Lauder Professor and Professor of Marketing at The Wharton School of the University of Pennsylvania. He joined the Wharton faculty in January 1967, upon receipt of his doctorate from Stanford University.

Awards 
Wind is the recipient of various awards, including the four major marketing awards- The Charles Coolidge Parlin Award (1985), the AMA/Irwin Distinguished Educator Award (1993), the Paul D. Converse Award (1996) and the Buck Weaver Award (2007). He is the recipient of the first Faculty Impact Award given by Wharton Alumni (1993). In 1984, he was elected as member of the Attitude Research Hall of Fame and has won a number of research awards, including two Alpha Kappa Psi Foundation awards and a recent inclusion in JAR Classics issue of 18 articles that have withstood the test of time. In 2001, he was selected as one of the 10 Grand Auteurs in Marketing and later named as the 2003 recipient of the Elsevier Science Distinguished Scholar award of the Society for Marketing Advances. In May 2004 he was awarded as Honorary Fellow of the Decade by the Interdisciplinary Center Herzliya (Israel). In 2009, Wind was selected as one of the 10 Legends of Marketing and Sage published 8 edited volumes anthologizing his various publications in 2013.

Bibliography 

Wind is one of the most cited authors in marketing. His regular contributions to professional marketing literature include 23 books and over 250 papers, articles, and monographs encompassing the areas of marketing strategy, marketing research, new product and market development, consumer and industrial buying behavior, and global marketing.

Books 
 1966 Industrial Buying Behavior: Source Loyalty in the Purchase of Industrial Components
 1967 Industrial Buying and Creative Marketing with Patrick j. Robinson
 1968 Advertising Measurement and Decision Making with Homer Dalby and Irwin Gross
 1972 Market Segmentation (International Series in Management) with Ronald E. Frank and William F. Massy
 1972 Organizational Buying Behavior (Foundations of Marketing) with Frederick E. Webster
 1973 Multi-Attribute Decisions in Marketing: A Measurement Approach with Paul E. Green and Douglas Caroll
 1979 Marketing and Product Planning (in Spanish) 
 1982 Product Policy: Concepts, Methods and Strategies (Addison-Wesley Marketing Series)
 1992 The Silverlake Project: Transformation at IBM with Roy A. Bauer, Emilio Collar, Victor Tang and Patrick R. Houston
 1997 Driving Change: How the Best Companies are Preparing for the 21st Century with Jeremy Main
 1999 Leveraging Japan: Marketing to the New Asia with George Fields, Hotaka Katahira and Robert E. Gunther
 2002 Convergence Marketing: Strategies for Reaching the New Hybrid Consumer with Vijay Mahajan and Robert Gunther
 2004 Adventures in Conjoint Analysis: A Practitioner's Guide to Trade-Off Modeling and Applications with Abba Krieger and Paul E. Green
 2004 The Power of Impossible Thinking: Transform the Business of Your Life and the Life of Your Business with Colin Crook and Robert E. Gunther
 2007 Competing in a Flat World: Building Enterprises for a Borderless World with Victor K. Fung and William K. Fung

Articles 

 1968  Yoram  Wind, "The Determinants of Vendor Selection: The Evaluation Function Approach," Journal of Purchasing and Materials, 1968, pp 29–41
 1970  
 1972 
 1973 Yoram Wind, "A New Procedure for Concept Evaluation," Journal of Marketing, Vol. 37, No. 4 (Oct., 1973), pp. 2–11, Stable URL: https://www.jstor.org/stable/1250352
 1974  
 1976  Yoram Wind and Henry J. Claycamp, "Planning Product Line Strategy: A Matrix Approach," Journal of Marketing, Vol. 40, No. 1, 1976, pp. 2–9 Stable URL: https://www.jstor.org/stable/1250669
 1978 
 1980 
 1981 Phipps, A., Carroll, J.D. and Wind, Y.J., "Overlapping Clustering: A New Method for Product Positioning," Journal of Marketing Research, Vol. 18, No. 3 1981, pp. 310–317
 1983 
 1988 
 2002 
 2008 Yoram Wind, "A Plan to Invent the Marketing We Need Today," Sloan Management Review, 49.4, 2008, pp 21–28

Book Chapters 
 Yoram Wind, "Positioning Analysis and Strategy," in: George Day and Robin Wensley, The Interface of Marketing Strategy, JAI Press, 1990
 Yoram (Jerry) Wind and Paul E. Green, "Some Conceptual, Measurement, and Analytical Problems in Life Style Research," Chapter 4 in: William S Wells (ed), Lifestyle and Psychographics, American Marketing Association [Marketing Classics Press], 2011, pp 99–125 
 Yoram Wind and Vijay Mahajan, "The Challenge of Digital Marketing," Chapter 1 in:  Yoram (Jerry) Wind, Vijay Mahajan (eds), Digital Marketing: Global Strategies from the World's Leading Experts, Wiley, 2011

References 

Living people
Wharton School of the University of Pennsylvania faculty
American business theorists
Marketing theorists
Marketing people
American marketing people
Year of birth missing (living people)
Journal of Marketing editors